Ferricyanide is the anion [Fe(CN)6]3−. It is also called hexacyanoferrate(III) and in rare, but systematic nomenclature, hexacyanidoferrate(III). The most common salt of this anion is potassium ferricyanide, a red crystalline material that is used as an oxidant in organic chemistry.

Properties 
[Fe(CN)6]3− consists of a Fe3+ center bound in octahedral geometry to six cyanide ligands. The complex has Oh symmetry. The iron is low spin and easily reduced to the related ferrocyanide ion [Fe(CN)6]4−, which is a ferrous (Fe2+) derivative. This redox couple is reversible and entails no making or breaking of Fe–C bonds:
[Fe(CN)6]3− + e− ⇌ [Fe(CN)6]4−
This redox couple is a standard in electrochemistry.

Compared to main group cyanides like potassium cyanide, ferricyanides are much less toxic because of the strong bond between the cyanide ion (CN− ) and the Fe3+. They do react with mineral acids, however, to release highly toxic hydrogen cyanide gas.

Uses 
Treatment of ferricyanide with iron(II) salts affords the brilliant, long-lasting pigment Prussian blue, the traditional color of blueprints.

See also
Potassium ferricyanide
Ferrocyanide

References

Anions
Iron complexes
Cyanometallates
Iron(III) compounds